CKIQ-FM is a Classic Rock formatted broadcast radio station.  The station is licensed to Iqaluit, Nunavut and serves Iqaluit and Apex in the Nunavut in Canada.  CKIQ-FM is owned and operated by Northern Lights Entertainment, Inc.

The station also has a rebroadcaster, CKIQ-FM-2 at 99.9 FM, in Rankin Inlet.

References

External links
 Raven Rock Online
 CKGC-FM History - Canadian Communications Foundation
 

2002 establishments in Nunavut
Classic rock radio stations in Canada
Radio stations established in 2002
KIQ
KIQ